USRC Richard Rush was a  of the United States Revenue Cutter Service which served in the coastal waters of the western United States and the Department of Alaska.

Propulsion was provided by both a  steam engine driving a single propeller, and a schooner-rig of sail.

Rush was built by the Atlantic Iron Works in Boston, Massachusetts, launched 14 March 1874, and commissioned 21 July of that year. Fitting-out was completed in New York, and on 15 September the cutter sailed for San Francisco, arriving there 8 January 1875 after rounding Cape Horn. Among the plankowners was then First Lieutenant Michael A. Healy who at the time had never been on Alaska cruise but would later become an experienced captain of the Rush, Corwin, and Bear and become known throughout Alaskan waters as "Hell Roaring Mike" Healy. Healy assumed command of Rush in 1881 as a first lieutenant.

History

Service
From 1877 through 1881 Rush completed four cruises in Alaskan waters.  Thereafter the cutter was based in Port Townsend, Washington. In 1882 Rush was at San Francisco where the Royal Navy corvette  took aboard the Marquis of Lorne, Governor General of Canada, and his spouse the Princess Louise, daughter of Queen Victoria, for their trip to Victoria, Canada. An anonymous note threatened the British ship with destruction when the couple boarded, but a search by the crew of Richard Rush yielded nothing, and Comus was escorted out to sea by the American cutter.

Retirement
On 31 August 1885 the cutter was decommissioned and the hull and other fittings sold. The machinery was used in the construction of USRC Rush, a larger cutter, completed on 10 November 1885.

Notes

Citations

References cited

External links
Teacher's Resource for U.S. Coast Guard History pp. 20–21

 

Ships of the United States Revenue Cutter Service
1874 ships